Flemming Pedersen (born 2 September 1947) is a Danish former footballer who played as a left-back. He competed with the Denmark national team in the men's tournament at the 1972 Summer Olympics.

References

External links
 
 
 
 

1947 births
Living people
Sportspeople from Frederiksberg
Danish men's footballers
Association football fullbacks
Denmark international footballers
Denmark youth international footballers
Denmark under-21 international footballers
Olympic footballers of Denmark
Footballers at the 1972 Summer Olympics
Kjøbenhavns Boldklub players